Pontus Braunerhjelm (born 1953) is a Swedish economist who works as a professor at the Royal Institute of Technology (KTH), where he is head of the Department of Industrial Economics and Management. He has previously been Secretary General of the Swedish government Globalization Council and until 2014 CEO of the Swedish Entrepreneurship Forum.

Biography 
Braunerhjelm received his doctorate in international economics from the Graduate Institute of International Studies in Geneva in 1994, and also a doctorate from the Jönköping International Business School, in 1999, on knowledge capital, firm performance and network production.

Braunerhjelm was elected in 2009 as a member of the Royal Swedish Academy of Engineering Sciences.

On April 3, 2014, Braunerhjelm was appointed by the Swedish government chairman of the Entrepreneurship Committee with the task of reviewing corporate taxes and the conditions for starting, operating, developing and owning companies in Sweden.

His scientific publications have, according to Google Scholar, an h-index of 34.

Bibliography (selected) 
 2001 – Eliasson Gunnar, Braunerhjelm Pontus, red. Huvudkontoren flyttar ut: om de svenska huvudkontorens betydelse för tillväxt och välstånd (1. uppl.). Stockholm: SNS förl. Libris länk. 
 2004 – Braunerhjelm Pontus, Skogh Göran, red. Sista fracken inga fickor har: filantropi och ekonomisk tillväxt (1. uppl.). Stockholm: SNS förl. Libris länk. 
 2006 – Andersson, Thomas; Braunerhjelm Pontus, Jakobsson Ulf. Det svenska miraklet i repris?: om den tredje industriella revolutionen, globaliseringen och tillväxten (1. uppl.). Stockholm: SNS förlag. Libris länk. 
 2008 – (på engelska) Entrepreneurship, knowledge, and economic growth. Foundations and trends in entrepreneurship, 1551-3114 ; 2008:5. Boston: Now Publishers. Libris länk. 
 2012 – Braunerhjelm, Pontus; Eklund Klas, Henrekson Magnus. Ett ramverk för innovationspolitiken: hur göra Sverige mer entreprenöriellt?. Stockholm: Samhällsförlaget. Libris länk. 
 2013 – Braunerhjelm Pontus, red. Institutioner och incitament för innovation: entreprenöriella vägval för svensk tillväxt. Swedish Economic Forum report ; 2013. Stockholm: Entreprenörskapsforum. Libris länk
 2016 – Braunerhjelm Pontus, Larsson Johan P., Thulin Per, Skoogberg Ylva, red (på engelska). The entrepreneurial challenge: a comparative study of entrepreneurial dynamics in China, Europe and the US. Örebro: Swedish Entrepreneurship Forum. Libris länk.

Awards 
Eklund Johan, Norlin Pernilla, red (2018). Festskrift till Pontus Braunerhjelm. [Örebro]: Entreprenörskapsforum. Libris länk.  - festskrift till Braunerhjelms 65-årsdag.

References 

Graduate Institute of International and Development Studies alumni
Swedish economists
Academic staff of the KTH Royal Institute of Technology
Members of the Royal Swedish Academy of Engineering Sciences
1953 births
Living people